Warrington was a parliamentary constituency in the United Kingdom.  From 1832 to 1983 it returned one Member of Parliament (MP) to the House of Commons of the Parliament of the United Kingdom.

History
The Warrington constituency covered the central part of the town of Warrington in Lancashire and surrounding area.

In 1983 it was abolished and replaced by Warrington North and Warrington South constituencies.

Boundaries
The Parliamentary Borough of Warrington was defined by the Parliamentary Boundaries Act 1832 as comprising:
The respective Townships of Warrington and Latchford; and also those two detached portions of the township of Thelwall which lie between the boundary of the township of Latchford and the River Mersey  It was this area that was incorporated as a Municipal Borough in 1847. The boundaries were unchanged until 1918 when the constituency was redefined as being identical with the area of the County Borough of Warrington. The constituency boundaries were widened to reflect those of the County Borough in 1950, at the same time it was renamed as Warrington Borough Constituency.

Members of Parliament

Election results

Elections in the 1830s

Elections in the 1840s

Elections in the 1850s

Elections in the 1860s

Elections in the 1870s

Elections in the 1880s

Elections in the 1890s

Elections in the 1900s

Elections in the 1910s 

General Election 1914–15:

Another General Election was required to take place before the end of 1915. The political parties had been making preparations for an election to take place and by the July 1914, the following candidates had been selected; 
Unionist: Harold Smith
Liberal:

Elections in the 1920s

Elections in the 1930s

Elections in the 1940s

Elections in the 1950s

Elections in the 1960s

Elections in the 1970s

Elections in the 1980s

References

Parliamentary constituencies in North West England (historic)
Constituencies of the Parliament of the United Kingdom established in 1832
Constituencies of the Parliament of the United Kingdom disestablished in 1983
Politics of Warrington